Shamo Quaye (22 October 1971 – 30 November 1997) was a football player from Ghana, who was a member of the Men's National Team that won the bronze medal at the 1992 Summer Olympics in Barcelona, Spain.

Career 
He played for Hearts of Oak in his native country. At the time of death he was playing for Umeå FC in Sweden, but he was in his home country with the national team. During practice Quaye was hit in the face. He died two days later from sudden complications.

External links 
 
 
 
 

1971 births
1997 deaths
People from Tema
Ghanaian footballers
Ghana international footballers
Footballers at the 1992 Summer Olympics
Olympic footballers of Ghana
Olympic bronze medalists for Ghana
Accra Hearts of Oak S.C. players
Al-Qadsiah FC players
Umeå FC players
Saudi Professional League players
Allsvenskan players
Olympic medalists in football
Ghanaian expatriate footballers
Ghanaian expatriate sportspeople in Saudi Arabia
Expatriate footballers in Sweden
Expatriate footballers in Saudi Arabia
Association football players who died while playing
Association football midfielders
Medalists at the 1992 Summer Olympics
Sport deaths in Ghana